Mohammad Shahidullah is a Jatiya Party (Ershad) politician and the former Member of Parliament of Gazipur-4.

Early life
Shahidullah was born into a Bengali Muslim family in Kapasia, Gazipur District.

Career
Shahidullah was elected to parliament from Gazipur-4 as a Jatiya Party candidate in 1986.

References

Jatiya Party politicians
Living people
3rd Jatiya Sangsad members
Year of birth missing (living people)
People from Kapasia Upazila
20th-century Bengalis